The California Bureau of Narcotic Enforcement (BNE) was a drug law enforcement agency, under the California Department of Justice (CA DOJ). The BNE was established in 1927, and was the oldest narcotic enforcement bureau in the United States at the time of it disbanding. In 2012, elements of the BNE were merged with its sister bureau forming the new California Bureau of Investigation (CBI or BI). Today, the CBI has taken over some of the former BNE's operations that had not been completely eliminated.

Role

Its programs targeted "major drug dealers, violent career criminals, clandestine drug manufacturers and violators of prescription drug laws". In its statewide agency role, it managed several programs involved in enforcing federal and state drug laws, as well as catching violent criminals who use illegal weapons while committing crimes. It coordinated with local law enforcement agencies. It used Special Operations Units, which identified individuals and groups involved in drug trafficking. They did so by examining financial records and performing undercover operations such as infiltration, surveillance, and tracing narcotic sources to clandestine manufacturers or importers. The BNE focused on targeting the trafficking operations and not minor figures within criminal groups. At the same time, through its diversion program, the Bureau trained doctors, nurses and pharmacists to help them "identify schemes and methods" used in obtaining controlled substances legitimately to then sell them illicitly. The BNE also took part in investigating medical professionals involved in such operations, for example by prescribing or dispensing controlled substances for illegal use.

Its headquarters were located in Sacramento among other CA DOJ investigative bureaus, with nine regional offices in Fresno, Los Angeles, Orange, Redding, Riverside, Sacramento, San Diego, San Francisco, and San Jose. Task forces and operations within the Bureau of Narcotic Enforcement included the Campaign Against Marijuana Planting (CAMP), the Clandestine Laboratory Enforcement Program (Clan Lab or CLEP), Violence Suppression Units (VSU), the CrackDown Program, the California Triplicate Prescription Program (TPP), the Diversion Program, the Financial Investigations Program (FIP), Special Operation Units (SOU), and over 50 regional narcotics task forces throughout California. 48 regional narcotic task forces previously run by BNE now fall under the CBI. In 2009, the BNE had 187 agents.

List of Chiefs of BNE

References

External links
Archive of Official BNE Government Website
Former Official BNE Website

California law
Drug policy of the United States
Defunct law enforcement agencies of California
Defunct state law enforcement agencies of the United States
Defunct state agencies of California